Jean Lemaire de Belges (c. 1473c. 1525) was a Walloon poet and historian, and pamphleteer who, writing in French, was the last and one of the best of the school of poetic 'rhétoriqueurs' (“rhetoricians”) and the chief forerunner, both in style and in thought, of the Renaissance humanists in France and Flanders.

Biography

He was born in Hainaut (Hainault), the godson and possibly a nephew of Jean Molinet, and spent some time with him at Valenciennes, where the elder writer held a kind of academy of poetry. Lemaire in his first poems calls himself a disciple of Molinet. In certain aspects he does belong to the school of the grands rhétoriqueurs ("rhetoricians"), but his great merit as a poet is that he emancipated himself from the affectations of his masters. This independence of the Flemish school he owed in part perhaps to his studies at the University of Paris and to the study of the Italian poets at Lyon, a centre of the French Renaissance. In 1504 he was attached to the court of Margaret of Austria, duchess of Savoy, afterwards Regent of the Netherlands. For this princess he undertook more than one mission to Rome where he came into contact with the culture of the Italian Renaissance; he became her librarian and a canon of Valenciennes. 

To Margaret were addressed his most original poems, the burlesque , of 1505 (see 1505 in poetry). The  (green lover) of the title being a green parrot belonging to his patroness. This latter piece was subsequently utilised in the sublimely melancholic  (Within this tomb) by Pierre de la Rue. It is an intense elegiac farewell to Margaret's 'green lover'. 

Lemaire gradually became more French in his sympathies, eventually entering the service of Anne of Brittany, wife of Louis XII, and supporting Louis's ambitions to create a church relatively independent of the Pope. His prose  (1510–1514), largely adapted from Benoît de Sainte-Maure, is a novel-like history that connects the House of Burgundy with Hector.

Lemaire probably died before 1525. Étienne Pasquier, Pierre de Ronsard and Joachim du Bellay all acknowledged their indebtedness to him.

Works
A 4-volume edition of his works, edited by Jean Stecher, was published in Leuven in 1882-1891.

Prose
 1510–1514:

Poetry
 1504 or 1505: , on the death of Philibert II, Duke of Savoy, the second husband of Archduchess Margaret of Austria
 1505: 
 1507: , written in support of a popular revolt
 1511: , referring to the French and Italian languages, urging cultural unity

Epîtres de l'Amant vert
While a poet in residence at the court of Margaret of Austria, Jean wrote two rhymed letters extolling his patroness. The first epistle is a witty parody of the Ovidian farewell love letter, the second of the tradition of Virgil's Aeneid and Dante's Divine Comedy. The letters, written to defend the value of French poetry, were written around 1505, published around 1510-1511, and hide his own private subject under the guise of a green parrot.

References

Attribution

External links
 MS 232/11 Pronosticque historial de la félicité future de l'an mil cincq cens et douze at OPenn
 Online Bibliography (database of Lemaire-related scholarly production published from 1880 onward)

1470s births
1520s deaths
Belgian poets in French